Prigorodnoye is a specialized seaport in the Korsakovsky District of Sakhalin Oblast, on the Pacific coast in the Russian Far East. It is located on the Mereya River, not far from the district's administrative center of Korsakov.

History

It was known as  when it was part of Japan from 1905 to 1945.

The port is now the site of the large liquefied natural gas plant constructed under the auspices of the Sakhalin-II project.

Buildings and structures in Sakhalin Oblast
Ports and harbours of the Russian Pacific Coast
Geography of Sakhalin Oblast
Transport in Sakhalin Oblast